Virgilia is an unincorporated community in Plumas County, California. It lies at an elevation of 2782 feet (848 m).

The Virgilia post office operated from 1929 to 1965. The name honors Virgilia Bogue, daughter of railroad executive Virgil Bogue.

References

Unincorporated communities in California
Unincorporated communities in Plumas County, California